The Pearl Spring Chess Tournament was a double round robin chess tournament event featuring six super-GM players  that took place in Nanjing, Jiangsu, China. The first edition in December 2008 was won by Veselin Topalov. According to ChessVibes website, Silvio Danailov - the manager and coach of Topalov - said the Pearl Spring tournament has been "guaranteed for five years and will enter in Grand Slam [in 2009]." The second and third tournaments in 2009 and 2010 were both won by Magnus Carlsen, with his first win being rated as one of the best performances in chess history.

Together with Corus Chess Tournament in the Netherlands, Linares Chess Tournament in Spain, M-Tel Masters in Bulgaria, and Grand Slam Masters Final in Spain, Nanjing Pearl Spring Chess Tournament became one of the five Grand Slam Tournaments in the world. It was the first in Asia and the only one in China.

Venue
The tournament was named after the venue, the Mingfa Pearl Spring Hotel located in Pukou District of Nanjing.

Organization
The tournament was organized by the Municipal People's Government of Nanjing and Chess & Cards Administration Center of General Administration of Sport of China, and the People's Government of Pukou District, Nanjing, and Nanjing Administration of Sport

Tournament Director: Wang Yonghong
Chief arbiter: Casto Abundo
Arbiters: Tang Jianming,  Feng Zhe,  Zhang Jilin

The organization web site did not disclose the player invitation criteria or protocol. In each of the first three years, one participant was of Chinese nationality.

Sponsorship
The tournament was sponsored by Jiangsu Kanion Pharmaceutical Co., Ltd., Yangzi Evening News, and Mundell International University of Entrepreneurship. The total prize fund was €250,000 with a first prize of €80,000.

Support
The tournament has received support from FIDE, the European Chess Union (ECU) and the Asian Chess Federation.

Guests
Guests invited to the opening ceremony included Kirsan Ilyumzhinov, President of the World Chess Federation; Boris Kutin, President of ECU; Sheikh Sultan, President of ACU and Liang Zhirong, Secretary-General of FIDE, Xu Jialu, Vice-chairman of the Standing Committee of the National People's Congress and Nobel Prize winner, Robert A. Mundell.

Results

2008
10-22 December

The six players were Veselin Topalov of Bulgaria (Elo rating 2791, ranked first in the world); Vassily Ivanchuk of Ukraine (Elo rating 2786, ranked third in the world); Levon Aronian of Armenia (Elo rating 2757, ranked seventh in the world); Sergei Movsesian of Slovakia (Elo rating 2732, ranked thirteenth in the world); Peter Svidler of Russia (Elo rating 2727, ranked seventeenth in the world); Bu Xiangzhi of China (Elo rating 2714, ranked twenty-sixth in the world). With at least an Elo rating average of 2751.6, it was a category 21 tournament making it the strongest chess tournament ever held in China.

{| class="wikitable" style="text-align: center;"
|+1st Pearl Spring, 11–21 December 2008, Nanjing, China, Category XXI (2751)
! !! Player !! Rating !! 1 !! 2 !! 3 !! 4 !! 5 !! 6 !! Points !! TPR !! Place
|-
|-style="background:#ccffcc;"
| 1 || align=left |  || 2791 ||  || ½ 1 || ½ ½ || 1 1 || ½ 1 || ½ ½ || 7 || 2892 || 1
|-
| 2 || align=left |  || 2757 || ½ 0 ||  || ½ ½ || ½ ½ || 1 1 || ½ ½ || 5½ || 2786 || 2
|-
| 3 || align=left |  || 2714 || ½ ½ || ½ ½ ||  || ½ 0 || ½ 0 || 1 1 || 5 || 2758 || 3
|-
| 4 || align=left |  || 2727 || 0 0 || ½ ½ || ½ 1 ||  || ½ ½ || 0 1 || 4½ || 2720 || 4
|-
| 5 || align=left |  || 2786 || ½ 0 || 0 0 || ½ 1 || ½ ½ ||  || ½ ½ || 4 || 2672 || 5–6
|-
| 6 || align=left |  || 2732 || ½ ½ || ½ ½ || 0 0 || 1 0 || ½ ½ ||  || 4 || 2683 || 5–6
|}

2009
September 27 - October 9 (Category 21, 2764)

First tournament of the Grand Slam series 2009-2010.

{| class="wikitable" style="text-align: center;"
|+2nd Pearl Spring, 28 September – 9 October 2009, Nanjing, China, Category XXI (2764)
! !! Player !! Rating !! 1 !! 2 !! 3 !! 4 !! 5 !! 6 !! Points !! SB !! TPR
|-
|-style="background:#ccffcc;"
| 1 || align=left |  || 2772 ||  || 1 ½ || ½ 1 || 1 ½ || 1 ½ || 1 1 || 8 || || 3002
|-
| 2 || align=left |  || 2813 || 0 ½ ||  || ½ ½ || ½ ½ || ½ 1 || ½ 1 || 5½ || || 2789
|-
| 3 || align=left |  || 2736 || ½ 0 || ½ ½ ||  || ½ ½ || ½ ½ || ½ ½ || 4½ || || 2733
|-
| 4 || align=left |  || 2757 || 0 ½ || ½ ½ || ½ ½ ||  || ½ ½ || ½ 0 || 4 || 20.00 || 2693
|-
| 5 || align=left |  || 2762 || 0 ½ || ½ 0 || ½ ½ || ½ ½ ||  || ½ ½ || 4 || 19.25 || 2692
|-
| 6 || align=left |  || 2742 || 0 0 || ½ 0 || ½ ½ || ½ 1 || ½ ½ ||  || 4 || 17.25 || 2696
|}

2010
The 3rd edition of the tournament took place from October 19 to October 30; with at least an Elo rating average of 2766, it was a category 21 tournament.

{| class="wikitable" style="text-align: center;"
|+3rd Pearl Spring, 20–30 October 2010, Nanjing, China, Category XXI (2766)
! !! Player !! Rating !! 1 !! 2 !! 3 !! 4 !! 5 !! 6 !! Points !! SB !! TPR
|-
|-style="background:#ccffcc;"
| 1 || align=left |  || 2826 ||  || ½ ½ || 1 ½ || ½ ½ || 1 1 || 1 ½ || 7 || || 2903
|-
| 2 || align=left |  || 2800 || ½ ½ ||  || 0 1 || ½ ½ || 1 ½ || ½ 1 || 6 || || 2831
|-
| 3 || align=left |  || 2716 || 0 ½ || 1 0 ||  || 1 ½ || ½ 0 || 1 ½ || 5 || || 2776
|-
| 4 || align=left |  || 2719 || ½ ½ || ½ ½ || 0 ½ ||  || ½ ½ || ½ ½ || 4½ || 23.00 || 2739
|-
| 5 || align=left |  || 2803 || 0 0 || 0 ½ || ½ 1 || ½ ½ ||  || ½ 1 || 4½ || 19.50 || 2722
|-
| 6 || align=left |  || 2732 || 0 ½ || ½ 0 || 0 ½ || ½ ½ || ½ 0 ||  || 3 || || 2623
|}

See also
List of strong chess tournaments
Grand Slam Chess Association
Dortmund Sparkassen Chess Meeting
Association of Chess Professionals
Chess around the world
FIDE Grand Prix 2008–2009

References

Pearl Spring Super Tournament  - more information from FIDE

External links
Official website
ChessBase Reports for 2008, 2009
Pictures of the Pearl Spring Chess Tournament

Chess competitions
Chess in China
2008 in chess
Recurring sporting events established in 2008
Sport in Nanjing
2009 in chess
2010 in chess